Gondo is a village in the Bamingui-Bangoran Prefecture in the northern Central African Republic.

External links
Satellite map at Maplandia.com

Populated places in Bamingui-Bangoran
N'Délé